Maharana Pratap Khel Gaon is a sports stadium in Udaipur, Rajasthan, India. It is committed to 12 sports, including Basketball, Volleyball, Tennis, Kho-Kho, Kabaddi, Handball, Archery, Rifle shooting, Judo – Karate, Boxing, Swimming, Squash.

Overview
Situated near Chitrakoot Nagar, Maharana Pratap Khel Gaon is developed with a joint venture by Urban Improvement Trust (UIT), Udaipur and Municipal Council of Udaipur. Shri Vikram Singh from Rajasthan State Sports Council is designated as the sports officer for this project.
During its development, Maharana Pratap Khel Gaon faced some controversies regarding the quality of construction and availability of basic amenities.
But with some additional efforts by UIT, and additional investments of Rs. 14 Crore, its development was set to right track. By 2020, Maharana Pratap Khel Gaon is expected to have a fully operational International Cricket Stadium.

See also

 Maharana Bhupal Stadium
 Gandhi Ground
 Luv Kush Indoor Stadium
 Udaipur International Cricket Stadium

References

Buildings and structures in Udaipur
Multi-purpose stadiums in India
Sport in Udaipur
Indoor arenas in India
Sports venues in Udaipur
Memorials to Maharana Pratap
Year of establishment missing